Campos Racing is a Spanish motor racing team, founded by former Formula One driver Adrián Campos. The team has been successful in Formula Three and the GP2 Series.

History
After retiring from racing, Campos formed his own team at the end of 1997, under the name Campos Motorsport. In 1998 the team began by competing in the new Open Fortuna by Nissan, with Marc Gené and Antonio García as drivers. Gené won the championship and García finished fifth, with Campos taking the teams title. Alonso went on to win the Euro Open Movistar by Nissan as it was renamed, with García finishing fifth again and Campos retaining the teams title. With Alonso moving onto International Formula 3000, García led the team in 2000, winning the championship and also helping Campos to win a third consecutive teams title. The series became the World Series by Nissan in 2002.

In 2004 the team switched its focus to the Spanish Formula Three Championship, running two teams with four drivers. In 2005, the team's name was changed to Campos Racing and they set up a team in the new GP2 Series, as well as running a team in Spanish Formula 3 as well as its Copa de España F300 class, which it won with Arturo Llobell in 2005 and Germán Sánchez in 2006.

Under the name of Campos Grand Prix, the team finished third in the GP2 drivers and teams championships, with Giorgio Pantano and Vitaly Petrov as drivers. In 2008, they won the teams championship and finished third in the drivers championship with Lucas di Grassi. They won their first overall Spanish F3 crown in 2008 with Germán Sánchez, and retained that title (now known as the European F3 Open) in 2009 with Bruno Méndez.

After the 2008 season, Campos passed control of his GP2 team to Spanish businessman Alejandro Agag, who renamed it Addax Team. In 2009, Campos was awarded a Formula One entry for his team to race in the  season, originally under the Campos Grand Prix name, but the name was soon changed to Campos Meta. After financial struggles, the team was bought out in February 2010 by majority shareholder José Ramón Carabante, who renamed it Hispania Racing.

Campos returned to GP2 in 2014 replacing the Addax Team on the grid, with drivers Arthur Pic and Kimiya Sato. Alexander Rossi replaced Sato at the Hockenheimring due to Sato competing in an Auto GP race.

Pic was retained for the 2015 GP2 season, with Rio Haryanto joining the team. In addition, Campos entered the GP3 Series in place of Hilmer Motorsport, with Álex Palou claiming a win.

In 2016, Mitch Evans and Sean Gelael joined the GP2 squad. In GP3, Palou was joined by Steijn Schothorst and Konstantin Tereshchenko.

In the 2017 FIA Formula 2 Championship, Ralph Boschung drove the #11 car except for the last round, whereas Robert Vișoiu entered most rounds with the #12. The GP3 drivers were Raoul Hyman, Julien Falchero and Marcos Siebert.

In , Luca Ghiotto switched to the team in F2 from Russian Time. He was partnered by Roy Nissany, then Roberto Merhi. In the GP3 Series the team was presented by Simo Laaksonen, while Diego Menchaca and Leonardo Pulcini restored their partnership with Campos, after they were previously teammates in the 2016 Euroformula Open Championship.

In 2019, the team joined the grid for the FIA Formula 3 Championship, signing Sebastián Fernández, Alessio Deledda, and Alex Peroni. For their Formula 2 campaign, the team signed Dorian Boccolacci and Jack Aitken.

In the 2020 FIA Formula 2 Championship the team retained Aitken and signed Guilherme Samaia. In Campos' 2020 FIA Formula 3 Championship campaign they retained Peroni and Deledda and signed Sophia Flörsch.

Team founder Adrián Campos died on 28 January 2021.

Current series results

FIA Formula 2 Championship

In detail

(key) (Races in bold indicate pole position) (Races in italics indicate fastest lap)

* Season still in progress.

FIA Formula 3 Championship

In detail
(key) (Races in bold indicate pole position) (Races in italics indicate fastest lap)

*Season in progress

F4 Spanish Championship

† Espírito Santo drove for Teo Martín Motorsport until round 2.

Formula Winter Series

Former series results

GP2 Series

 † Alexander Rossi raced for Caterham Racing for 10 races in 2014 scoring 10 of his 12 points.
 In 2008, the team raced under the Barwa International Campos Team banner.
 In 2016, the team raced under the Indonesia licence name Pertamina Campos Racing banner.

GP3 Series

WTCC

 † Esteban Guerrieri raced for Honda Racing Team JAS for 6 races in 2017 scoring 94 of his 241 points.

WTCR

 In 2018, the team raced under the Team Oscaro by Campos Racing banner.

Euroformula Open Championship

† Shared results with other teams

Results in detail

GP2 Series 
(key) (Races in bold indicate pole position) (Races in italics indicate fastest lap)

GP3 Series 
(key) (Races in bold indicate pole position) (Races in italics indicate fastest lap)

Timeline

Footnotes

References

External links

 

Spanish auto racing teams
GP2 Series teams
GP3 Series teams
Euroformula Open Championship teams
World Touring Car Championship teams
Auto racing teams established in 1997
1997 establishments in Spain
Auto GP teams
TCR International Series teams
TCR Asia Series teams
FIA Formula 2 Championship teams
FIA Formula 3 Championship teams
Formula E teams